The belagines were written laws which, according to Jordanes, were given to the Goths by Dicineus / Dekaineos, the Dacian-Getic legislator, Zalmoxian priest at the time of Burebista.

These belagines laws entered in the tradition of the Ostrogoths but it does not exclude similar Visigothic traditions, since the Dicineu / Dekaineos tradition no matter how literary it may be, points to Dacia.

Name 

Belagines (described by Jordanes as "compiled laws") is the transcription of the Gothic word *bi-lageineis "laws". The singular *bilageins is based on *bi-lagjan "lay down, impose".

6th century 

The Origo Gothica (555 AD) contains the Gothic term belagines for the tribal law. But the author claimed that this law had been written down in the distant past

Fictional character 

Danish scholar Arne Søby Christensen claims that the Getica was an entirely fabricated account, and that the origin of the Goths in the book is a construction based on popular Greek and Roman myths as well as a misinterpretation of recorded names from Northern Europe. The purpose of this fabrication, according to Christensen, was to establish a glorious identity for the peoples that had recently gained power in post-Roman Europe. 

Canadian scholar Walter Goffart suggests another incentive: Getica was part of a conscious plan by emperor Justinian and the propaganda machine at his court. He wanted to affirm that Goths (and their barbarian cousins) did not belong to the Roman world, thus justifying the claims of the Eastern Roman Empire to the western part of the latter.

References

Bibliography
 
 
 
 
 
 
 
 

Gothic language
Gothic writing